Ainsi soit Je... (a play on ainsi soit-il, which can mean either "so be it" or "amen") is the second album by Mylène Farmer, released in April 1988. It contains the hit singles "Sans contrefaçon", "Pourvu qu'elles soient douces" and "Sans logique". Generally well received by critics, it was very successful and remains to date the second best-selling album of the singer.

Background 
After the success of the album Cendres de lune and the hits "Sans contrefaçon" and "Ainsi soit je...", Farmer had no problem releasing a second album that would be well received by the public, enabling her to consolidate her growing popularity, thus preventing her from slipping back into anonymity. The album took from five to six months to be finished. It was recorded at studio Mega, Avenue Maréchal-Maunoury, in Paris (XVIe arrondissement) under the leadership of Thierry Rogen, a renowned sound engineer who had already worked in particular with Michel Sardou.

The cover of the album shows Farmer turned sideways, accompanied by the puppet used in the music video for "Sans contrefaçon". The photographs of the booklet were made by Elsa Trillat.

The album was released in April 1988 and met great success, both critically and commercially.

Lyrics and music 
The texts, which contain many literary references to famous authors (such as Baudelaire, Poe, etc.), were written by Mylène Farmer, except "L'Horloge" (a poem by Charles Baudelaire), "Déshabillez-moi" (originally sung in 1966 by Juliette Gréco) and "The Farmer's Conclusion" (which is an instrumental song). The album has a melancholy and sad tone, and deals with death, suicide, madness with gloomy and desperate texts. Sexual ambiguity, sodomy and provocation are also tackled.

Critical reception 

The album was generally well received in the media and remains sometimes considered as "one of the most successful", even the singer's "best album". When the album was released, the press said: "Mylène shows an imagination and a new maturity in these charming libertine poems and her synthetic hits containing literary references" (20 Ans). This "great" (Gaipied) and "successful" (Les Dernières Nouvelles d'Alsace) album has "an intellectual and musical universe always so creative" (Gaipied). Its songs were described as "powerful, sometimes catchy and often spellbinding compositions" (Paris Nuit), whose texts are "chiseled but perfectly licentious" (France Soir). The "poetic quality of the texts" and "the sense of the melody" (Le Télégramme) were also mentioned. Rock and Folk said this Laurent Boutonnat's production is "impeccable", demonstrating his "undoubted talent". According to Télé Poche, "the time of success has come for Mylène Farmer" with this album. The journalist Caroline Bee said this album is "an ambiguous, bright, romantic and beautifully produced gem".

Some criticisms were also made against Ainsi soit je... For example, according to L'Humanité, this album uses an "old-fashioned stylistic mannerism to reinvent poetry" (L'Humanité). Rock Land qualified this album as a "second collection of bad thoughts with a spectacular flippantly", whose "B-side is flat".

Commercial performance 
In France, the album debuted at number 8 in April 1988, but it dropped to number 26 five months later. However, thanks to the successful single "Pourvu qu'elles soient douces" (number-one hit in December 1988), the album reached number one for two weeks in December 1988. The album managed to stay for eleven months in the top ten and about one year on the chart. On 29 June 1988, the album was certified Gold by the SNEP for 100,000 copies sold, then Platinum for 300,000 sales, then Double Platinum on 17 February 1989 for 600,000 sales, and eventually Diamond on 14 November 1989 for a minimum of 1,000,000 copies sold. The album was also released in Germany, where it reached number 47.

Track listing

Charts

Weekly charts

Year-end charts

Certifications and sales

Personnel 

 Mylène Farmer – lead vocals
 Laurent Boutonnat – keyboards, synthesizer, producer
 Thierry Rogen – sound, mixing, programming
 Slim Pezin – guitar
 Bernard Paganotti – bass
 Pol Ramirez del Più  (a pseudonym for Farmer and Boutonnat) – pan flute, shakuhachi
 Les Moines Fous du Tibet  (a pseudonym for Farmer and Boutonnat) – background vocals
 Frédéric Rousseau – programming
 Bertrand Le Page / Polygram Music – editions (tracks 1–8, 10), Intersong Paris editions (track 9)
 André Perriat (Top Master) – mastering, engraving
 Elsa Trillat – photo
 Jean-Paul Théodule – model
 Benoît Lestang – puppet 
 Bertrand Le Page – management
 Recorded and mixed at Studio Mega

Release history

Formats 

 France
 12"
 CD
 CD – Picture disc
 Cassette
 CD – Digipack (since 2005)

 Other countries
 Collector edition – Promo – Europe (Germany, Italy, UK, Spain)1
 12" – Spain
 12" – Korea
 12" – Canada
 12" – Germany

 12" – Promo – Canada
 CD – Germany
 CD – Japan
 CD – Taïwan
 CD – Promo – Japan
 Cassette – Netherlands
 Cassette – Italy
 Cassette – Canada

1 Contains the CD maxi for "Sans contrefaçon", the CD single for "Ainsi soit je...", the biography of Farmer translated into the language of the country, a documentary on video cassette and a lighter.

References 

1988 albums
Mylène Farmer albums
Polydor Records albums